Gorboduc (Welsh: Gorwy or Goronwy) was a legendary king of the Britons as recounted by Geoffrey of Monmouth. He was married to Judon. When he became old, his sons, Ferrex and Porrex, feuded over who would take over the kingdom. Porrex tried to kill his brother in an ambush, but Ferrex escaped to France. With the French king Suhardus, he invaded Britain, but was defeated and killed by Porrex. Porrex was killed in revenge by his own mother Judon, then the high strata of society killed his mother and then there was a war between high strata and low strata leading to an anarchy in the society. This anarchy led to civil war denouncing Gorboduc. Geoffrey does not state when Gorbuduc died, but he is not mentioned after the account of the strife between his sons.

Cultural references
Gorboduc's life is the subject of the 1561 play Gorboduc, which is historically important for being the model for later Elizabethan drama, for example, Shakespeare's The Tragedie of King Lear and The Lamentable Tragedy of Titus Andronicus.  It is the first play written throughout in blank verse. The story, like that of his ancestor King Lear, was used by Elizabethans as a warning of the dangers of civil discord.

"A niece of King Gorboduc" is mentioned briefly by the Fool in Shakespeare's Twelfth Night.

"Gorboduc" is the name of a poem by John Ashbery that appears in the collection April Galleons.

References

Legendary British kings